The Ministry of Internal Affairs of Ukraine (MVS) is the ministry of the Ukrainian government that oversees the interior affairs of Ukraine. The ministry carries out state policy for the protection of rights and liberties of citizens, investigates unlawful acts against the interest of society and state, fights crime, provides civil order, ensures civil security and traffic safety, and guarantees the security and protection of important individuals. It is a centralised agency headed by the Minister of Internal Affairs. The ministry works closely with the office of the General Prosecutor of Ukraine. It oversees the National Police of Ukraine (police service), National Guard of Ukraine (gendarmerie), the State Emergency Service of Ukraine (civil defense), State Border Guard Service of Ukraine (and its subordinate the Ukrainian Sea Guard) and the State Migration Service (customs service).

Formerly, the ministry directly controlled the Ukrainian national law enforcement agency, termed the militsiya (Russian: милиция). This changed in July 2015, in the aftermath of Euromaidan, with the introduction of reforms by Ukrainian president Petro Poroshenko to reduce corruption, whereby the militsiya was replaced with the National Police. Ukraine's militsiya was widely regarded as corrupt, and it had received accusations of torture and ill-treatment. The State Emergency Service was transferred under the jurisdiction of the ministry since 2014.

History

Name
People's Committee of Internal Affairs of the Ukrainian SSR (1919–1930, regional autonomous agency)
State Political Directorate of the Ukrainian SSR (1930–1934, part of the Joint State Political Directorate of USSR)
People's Committee of Internal Affairs of the Ukrainian SSR (1934–1946, part of the People's Committee of Internal Affairs of USSR)
Ministry of Internal Affairs of the Ukrainian SSR (1946–1991, part of the Ministry of Internal Affairs of USSR)
Ministry of Internal Affairs of Ukraine (since 1991, a government agency of the independent Ukraine)

History of Militsiya

Ministerial institutions
Central office (in Kyiv)

Sub-departments (central offices of executive authority)
National Guard of Ukraine
National Police of Ukraine
Special Tasks Patrol Police
State Border Guard Service of Ukraine
Ukrainian Sea Guard
State Emergency Service of Ukraine
State Migration Service of Ukraine

Supporting institutions

Medical
Central hospital (in Kyiv)
Hospital of Rehabilitative Treatment (in Kyiv)
Military-medical commissions

Educational
National Academy of Internal Affairs
National Academy of National Guard of Ukraine
Kharkiv National University of Internal Affairs
Dnipropetrovsk State University of Internal Affairs
Didorenko State University of Internal Affairs of Luhansk
Lviv State University of Internal Affairs
Odessa State University of Internal Affairs
Donetsk Justice Institute

Ministers of Internal Affairs

The Minister of Internal Affairs is in charge of the ministry. Prior to the 2015 police reforms, the minister was recognized as head of the militsiya. Many former ministers previously had experience with serving in the police, and were, prior to taking up the ministerial post, generals of the militsiya. Typically, the minister was afforded the rank of Colonel-General of the militsiya upon taking up his post in the Ukrainian government. Yuriy Lutsenko and Vasyl Tsushko are the only former holders of this office who had never served in any law enforcement agency.

The minister of Internal Affairs is responsible directly to the Prime Minister of Ukraine, to the Ukrainian Parliament (Verkhovna Rada) and ultimately the President of Ukraine. His office is located in Kyiv's Pechersk District.

See also
Berkut (special police force)
General of Internal Affairs of Ukraine
Internal Troops of Ukraine
Prosecutor General of Ukraine
Security Service of Ukraine

References

How Top Spies in Ukraine Changed the Nation's Path by K.J.Chivers of the New York Times
How the Gongadze Case Has Been Investigated (June 2005 Ukrayinska Pravda article on the history of the Gongadze Case investigation) 
The Key Witness in the Gongadze Case Dead (March 2005 Ukrayinska Pravda article on the death of Kravchenko, analysing also his role in the Gongadze case - includes fragments of the Melnychenko recordings)

Further reading
Full collection of laws of the Russian Empire since 1649. Vol.5. Saint Petersburg, 1830. page 13. (Полное собрание законов Российской империи с 1649 г. - Спб., 1830. - Т. 5. - С. 13)

External links

Official website of the Ministry of Internal Affairs of Ukraine 
Ukraine Police Twitter
Overview of MVS' special units 
How to Avoid Problems with Ukrainian police 

 
National Security and Defense Council of Ukraine
Internal Affairs
Ukraine